Storsponen Nunatak is a nunatak on the western side of Hoggestabben Butte, in the Muhlig-Hofmann Mountains of Queen Maud Land. Mapped by Norwegian cartographers from surveys and air photos by the Norwegian Antarctic Expedition (1956–60) and named Storsponen (the big chip).

Nunataks of Queen Maud Land
Princess Martha Coast